Rozendaal is a Dutch toponymic surname. Literally meaning "rose valley", the name may indicate an origin in the city of Roosendaal, North Brabant or the towns Rozendaal (Gelderland), Rozendaal (South Holland), or Rozendaal (French Flanders). Both the surname and these town names may also have evolved from Roesendael, meaning "reed valley". Among variant spellings are Roosendaal, Roosendael, Roozendaal, and Rosendaal, each pronounced  in Dutch. People with these surnames include:

Eric Roozendaal (born 1962), Australian (New South Wales) politician
Frank Rozendaal (1957–2013), Dutch ornithologist and zoologist
 (born 1959), Dutch physician and thrombosis researcher
Jack Rosendaal (born 1973), Dutch decathlete
Maarten van Roozendaal (1962–2013), Dutch singer, comedian and songwriter
Nicolaas Roosendael (1634–1686), Dutch painter
Peter Roozendaal (born 1962), Australian rules footballer
Rafaël Rozendaal (born 1980), Dutch-Brazilian visual artist active in New York City
Richard Rozendaal (born 1972), Dutch track cyclist
Ruben Rozendaal (1956–2017), Surinamese soldier involved in the 1980 military coup d'état
Ton Roosendaal (born 1960),  Dutch software developer and film producer
Trijnie Roozendaal-Rep (born 1950), Dutch speed skater

See also
Roosendael Abbey in the province of Antwerp, Belgium
Rosendahl (disambiguation)
Rosendale (disambiguation)
Rosendal (disambiguation)
Rosenthal
Rozendal, suburb of Stellenbosch, South Africa

References

Dutch-language surnames
Toponymic surnames